Elizabeth Hoffman may refer to:

Elizabeth Hoffman (actress) (born 1927), American actress
Elizabeth Hoffman (professor) (born 1946),  Betsy Hoffman, vice president of Iowa State University, former president of the University of Colorado
Elizabeth C. Hoffman (1942–2007), a.k.a. Betty Hoffman, New York politician
Elizabeth Hoffman, winner of Miss South Dakota Teen USA 2008
Elizabeth Maud Hoffman (1927–2009), Australian indigenous rights activist

See also
Elizabeth (disambiguation)
Hoffman (disambiguation)
Elizabeth Cobbs (born 1956), American historian and author who sometimes uses the pen name Elizabeth Cobbs Hoffman